Dave Flint (born August 17, 1971) is an American ice hockey coach. He is the current head coach for Northeastern. He previously served as the head coach for Saint Anselm's women's ice hockey team.

Coaching career

Saint Anselm College
Flint served as an assistant coach for the Saint Anselm Hawks men's hockey team for seven years. He then took over the women's hockey team in 2003 and oversaw the program's transition to varsity status. In their first varsity season, he led St. Anselm to a 21–3–1 record and an ECAC Open championship in 2004–05. The Hawks then won consecutive ECAC Open titles in his final two seasons with the team in 2006–07 and 2007–08. During his four-year tenure as head coach, he compiled an 88–15–2 record, and was named the ECAC East Coach of the Year three times, and was a three-time finalist for National Coach of the Year.

Northeastern University
During the 2015–16 season, he led the Huskies to a 28–9–1 record, and reached the NCAA Women's Ice Hockey Tournament for the first time in program history. On September 11, 2017, Flint signed a four-year contract extension with Northeastern through the 2020–21 season. During the 2019–20 season, he led the Huskies to a NCAA best 32–4–2 record, their winningest season in program history and was named Hockey East Coach of the Year, and New England Coach of the Year.

During the 2020–21 season, he led the Huskies to a 22–2–1 record, their fourth consecutive Hockey East championship, and the NCAA Women's Ice Hockey Tournament for the fourth consecutive year. They advanced to the National Championship game for the first time in program history where they lost to Wisconsin 1–2 in overtime. Following the season, he was named Hockey East Coach the Year for the third consecutive year, and AHCA Coach of the Year.

On May 6, 2021, Flint signed a four-year contract extension with Northeastern through the 2024–25 season. During the 2022–23 season, he led the Huskies to a 34–2–1 record, their sixth consecutive Hockey East championship and the Frozen Four for the third consecutive year. Following the season, he was named AHCA Coach of the Year.

Team USA
Since 2005, Flint has also been a member of the USA Hockey staff. In 2008, he was appointed the goaltending coach and advisor for the women's national program, where he evaluated and instructed goaltenders at all levels. On April 24, 2008, he was named an assistant coach for U.S. Women's Select Team at the Four Nations Cup.

On May 25, 2009, Flint was named an assistant coach for the United States women's national ice hockey team at the 2009 IIHF Women's World Championship. On June 7, 2009, he was named an assistant coach for the United States women's national ice hockey team at the 2010 Winter Olympics.

Head coaching record

References

External links

1971 births
Living people
American ice hockey coaches
Northeastern Huskies women's ice hockey coaches
People from Merrimack, New Hampshire